is a retired Japanese professional mixed martial artist. A professional competitor from 2001–2013, Chonan competed for the UFC, PRIDE, DEEP, DREAM, Pancrase, and World Victory Road. Chonan is the former DEEP Middleweight Champion and the former DEEP Welterweight Champion.

Mixed martial arts career

Early career
Chonan's roots are in Kyokushin Karate, which he began in high school before later moving to Thailand to train. Chonan officially began his professional mixed martial arts career in 2001, losing his first fight in Pancrase – Neo Blood Tournament. He then went on to fight in DEEP, going 6-2 in the organization including a TKO win against Hayato Sakurai.

Chonan fought in PRIDE Bushido 3 as a representative of Team Japan, losing a decision to Ricardo Almeida. Then at PRIDE Bushido 5 he went on to defeat Carlos Newton via unanimous decision.

Chonan's next win was against future UFC Middleweight Champion Anderson Silva at PRIDE: Shockwave 2004, where he executed a spectacular flying scissor-lock takedown, followed quickly by a heel-hook submission.

Chonan returned in DEEP defeating Roan Carneiro via TKO at 18th Impact.

He won his fight at PRIDE Bushido 7 against Nino Schembri via unanimous decision. His next fight was a KO loss against Phil Baroni at PRIDE Bushido 8. He also lost his next fight against future teammate Dan Henderson via KO at the opening seconds of the bout at PRIDE Bushido 9.

He returned at DEEP: 23 Impact to defeat Ryuta Sakurai by TKO to become the DEEP Middleweight Champion.

In the 2006 PRIDE Welterweight Grand Prix, Chonan suffered a broken orbital bone at the end of his match against Joey Villasenor caused by a stomp but was able to continue in the tournament. In his next match of the tournament, against Paulo Filho, Chonan was submitted by armbar early in the first round.

In February 2007, Chonan returned to DEEP and defeated former DEEP Middleweight Champion Ryuta Sakurai to retain the Middleweight Championship.

Ultimate Fighting Championship
Ryo Chonan made his UFC debut against Karo Parisyan on November 17, 2007, at UFC 78 which Chonan lost via unanimous decision after three rounds.

Chonan then defeated Roan Carneiro in their rematch via split decision on September 6, 2008, at UFC 88.

Chonan was also defeated in his next fight on December 27, 2008, by Brad Blackburn. Blackburn controlled the first two rounds before Chonan was significantly more dominant in the third round. He was unable to finish the fight by T/KO or submission and lost by unanimous decision, 2 rounds to 1.

Chonan is currently a part of the Team Quest, along with former PRIDE Fighting Championships Middleweight and Welterweight Champion Dan Henderson, Matt Lindland, Jason "Mayhem" Miller, and Rameau Thierry Sokoudjou.

Ryo Chonan was subsequently released from the UFC following a controversial split decision loss to T. J. Grant.

Return to Japan
He won his fight at DEEP : 43 Impact against Jutaro Nakao by unanimous decision.

Chonan made his DREAM debut at DREAM 13 defeating Andrews Nakahara by unanimous decision.

He then made his World Victory Road debut at Soul of Fight on December 30, 2010. Chonan was originally scheduled to face Dan Hornbuckle, but illness forced Hornbuckle off the card and he was replaced by Taisuke Okuno. Chonan lost the fight via KO in the first round.

Chonan returned at DEEP: 54 Impact on June 24, 2011, against Iwase Shigetoshi. Chonan won the fight by knockout.

On October 29, Chonan defeated Naoki Samukawa by unanimous decision.

Chonan returned at Fight For Japan: Genki Desu Ka Omisoka 2011 where he faced Hayato Sakurai. He lost the fight via unanimous decision.

On October 20, 2013, Chonan fought Dan Hornbuckle in his retirement fight. He won the fight by unanimous decision and retired as DEEP Welterweight Champion.

Championships and accomplishments
DEEP
DEEP Middleweight Championship (One time)
One successful title defense
DEEP Welterweight Championship (One time)
Sherdog
2004 Submission of the Year-  vs. Anderson Silva on December 31
Sports Illustrated
2000s Best Submission of the Decade-  vs. Anderson Silva on December 31, 2004 
2000s One Hit Wonder 
Bleacher Report
2000s Submission of the Decade-  vs. Anderson Silva on December 31, 2004
MMAFighting
2004 Middleweight Fighter of the Year
2004 Submission of the Year-  vs. Anderson Silva on December 31

Mixed martial arts record

|-
| Win
| align=center| 22–13
| Dan Hornbuckle
| Decision (unanimous)
| DEEP: Tribe Tokyo Fight
| 
| align=center| 3
| align=center| 5:00
| Tokyo, Japan
| Won the DEEP Welterweight Championship.
|-
| Win
| align=center| 21–13
| Seichi Ikemoto
| Decision (unanimous)
| DEEP: Osaka Impact 2013
| 
| align=center| 3
| align=center| 5:00
| Osaka, Japan
| 
|-
| Loss
| align=center| 20–13
| Hayato Sakurai
| Decision (unanimous)
| Fight For Japan: Genki Desu Ka Omisoka 2011
| 
| align=center| 3
| align=center| 5:00
| Saitama, Japan
| 
|-
| Win
| align=center| 20–12
| Naoki Samukawa
| Decision (unanimous)
| Deep: Cage Impact 2011 in Tokyo, 2nd Round
| 
| align=center| 3
| align=center| 5:00
| Tokyo, Japan
| 
|-
| Win
| align=center| 19–12
| Shigetoshi Iwase
| KO (punch)
| Deep: 54 Impact
| 
| align=center| 1
| align=center| 4:45
| Tokyo, Japan
| 
|-
| Loss
| align=center| 18–12
| Taisuke Okuno
| KO (punch)
| World Victory Road Presents: Soul of Fight
| 
| align=center| 1
| align=center| 0:19
| Tokyo, Japan
| 
|-
| Win
| align=center| 18–11
| Jun Hee Moon
| TKO (punches)
| Deep: 50 Impact
| 
| align=center| 3
| align=center| 2:57
| Tokyo, Japan
| 
|-
| Loss
| align=center| 17–11
| Jung Hwan Cha
| KO (punches)
| Astra
| 
| align=center| 2
| align=center| 1:16
| Yokohama, Japan
| 
|-
| Win
| align=center| 17–10
| Andrews Nakahara
| Decision (unanimous)
| DREAM 13
| 
| align=center| 2
| align=center| 5:00
| Yokohama, Japan
| 
|-
| Win
| align=center| 16–10
| Jutaro Nakao
| Decision (unanimous)
| Deep: 43 Impact
| 
| align=center| 3
| align=center| 5:00
| Tokyo, Japan
| 
|-
| Loss
| align=center| 15–10
| T. J. Grant
| Decision (split)
| UFC 97
| 
| align=center| 3
| align=center| 5:00
| Montreal, Quebec, Canada
| 
|-
| Loss
| align=center| 15–9
| Brad Blackburn
| Decision (unanimous)
| UFC 92
| 
| align=center| 3
| align=center| 5:00
| Las Vegas, Nevada, United States
| 
|-
| Win
| align=center| 15–8
| Roan Carneiro
| Decision (split)
| UFC 88
| 
| align=center| 3
| align=center| 5:00
| Atlanta, Georgia, United States
| 
|-
| Loss
| align=center| 14–8
| Karo Parisyan
| Decision (unanimous)
| UFC 78
| 
| align=center| 3
| align=center| 5:00
| Newark, New Jersey, United States
| Vacated DEEP Middleweight Championship.
|-
| Win
| align=center| 14–7
| Seo Do Wong
| TKO (strikes)
| DEEP: DEEP in Yamagata
| 
| align=center| 1
| align=center| 2:58
| Yamagata, Japan
| Drops to Welterweight.
|-
| Win
| align=center| 13–7
| Ryuta Sakurai
| Decision (majority)
| DEEP: 28 Impact
| 
| align=center| 3
| align=center| 5:00
| Tokyo, Japan
| Defended DEEP Middleweight Championship.
|-
| Loss
| align=center| 12–7
| Paulo Filho
| Submission (armbar)
| PRIDE: Bushido 12
| 
| align=center| 1
| align=center| 2:30
| Nagoya, Japan
| PRIDE 2006 Welterweight Grand Prix Quarterfinal.
|-
| Win
| align=center| 12–6
| Joey Villaseñor
| Decision (split)
| PRIDE: Bushido 11
| 
| align=center| 2
| align=center| 5:00
| Saitama, Japan
| PRIDE 2006 Welterweight Grand Prix Opening Round.
|-
| Win
| align=center| 11–6
| Ryuta Sakurai
| TKO (doctor stoppage)
| DEEP: 23 Impact
| 
| align=center| 1
| align=center| 1:57
| Tokyo, Japan
| Won DEEP Middleweight Championship. Doctor stoppage due to cut.
|-
| Loss
| align=center| 10–6
| Dan Henderson
| KO (punch)
| PRIDE: Bushido 9
| 
| align=center| 1
| align=center| 0:22
| Tokyo, Japan
| 
|-
| Loss
| align=center| 10–5
| Phil Baroni
| KO (punch)
| PRIDE: Bushido 8
| 
| align=center| 1
| align=center| 1:40
| Nagoya, Japan
| 
|-
| Win
| align=center| 10–4
| Nino Schembri
| Decision (unanimous)
| PRIDE: Bushido 7
| 
| align=center| 2
| align=center| 5:00
| Tokyo, Japan
| 
|-
| Win
| align=center| 9–4
| Roan Carneiro
| TKO (doctor stoppage)
| DEEP: 18th Impact
| 
| align=center| 3
| align=center| 2:15
| Tokyo, Japan
| 
|-
| Win
| align=center| 8–4
| Anderson Silva
| Submission (flying scissor heel hook)
| PRIDE Shockwave 2004
| 
| align=center| 3
| align=center| 3:08
| Saitama, Japan
| MMAFighting Submission of The Year (2004).
|-
| Win
| align=center| 7–4
| Carlos Newton
| Decision (unanimous)
| PRIDE Bushido 5
| 
| align=center| 2
| align=center| 5:00
| Osaka, Japan
| 
|-
| Loss
| align=center| 6–4
| Ricardo Almeida
| Decision (unanimous)
| PRIDE Bushido 3
| 
| align=center| 2
| align=center| 5:00
| Yokohama, Japan
| 
|-
| Win
| align=center| 6–3
| Daijiro Matsui
| Decision (majority)
| DEEP: 13th Impact
| 
| align=center| 3
| align=center| 5:00
| Tokyo, Japan
| 
|-
| Win
| align=center| 5–3
| Hayato Sakurai
| TKO (doctor stoppage)
| DEEP: 12th Impact
| 
| align=center| 3
| align=center| 2:10
| Tokyo, Japan
| 
|-
| Win
| align=center| 4–3
| Yuji Hisamatsu
| Decision (majority)
| DEEP: 11th Impact
| 
| align=center| 3
| align=center| 5:00
| Osaka, Japan
| 
|-
| Loss
| align=center| 3–3
| Masanori Suda
| Decision (split)
| DEEP: 7th Impact
| 
| align=center| 3
| align=center| 5:00
| Tokyo, Japan
| 
|-
| Win
| align=center| 3–2
| Katsumi Usuta
| TKO (strikes)
| DEEP: 6th Impact
| 
| align=center| 1
| align=center| 0:05
| Tokyo, Japan
| 
|-
| Loss
| align=center| 2–2
| Eiji Ishikawa
| Decision (majority)
| DEEP: 5th Impact
| 
| align=center| 2
| align=center| 5:00
| Tokyo, Japan
| 
|-
| Win
| align=center| 2–1
| Kenji Akiyama
| TKO (submission to punches)
| DEEP: 4th Impact
| 
| align=center| 1
| align=center| 4:22
| Nagoya, Japan
| 
|-
| Win
| align=center| 1–1
| Takaku Fuke
| Decision (unanimous)
| DEEP: 3rd Impact
| 
| align=center| 3
| align=center| 5:00
| Tokyo, Japan
| 
|-
| Loss
| align=center| 0–1
| Hikaru Sato
| Decision (unanimous)
| Pancrase: 2001 Neo-Blood Tournament Eliminations
| 
| align=center| 3
| align=center| 5:00
| Japan
|

See also
List of male mixed martial artists

References

External links

Official MySpace
Pride official site 
Tribe MMA Official website

Living people
1976 births
Japanese male mixed martial artists
Welterweight mixed martial artists
Japanese male karateka
Japanese Muay Thai practitioners
Mixed martial artists utilizing Kyokushin kaikan
Mixed martial artists utilizing Muay Thai
Japanese expatriate sportspeople in Thailand
People from Yamagata Prefecture
Deep (mixed martial arts) champions
Ultimate Fighting Championship male fighters